Remixed and Reimagined is the second entry in Sony BMG’s Legacy Remixed series. This entry features Billie Holiday recordings culled from her years on Columbia Records.

Track listing
"I Hear Music" (Swingsett & Takuya’s Mighty Fine Remix)—5:10
"More than You Know" (Jazzeem’s Throwback Remix)—5:11
"Spreadin' Rhythm Around" (Lady Bug vs. Lady Day RR Remix)—4:00
"Long-Gone Blues" (GXR Remix)—5:03
"Trav'lin' All Alone" (Nickodemus & Zeb Remix)—3:48
"He Ain't Got Rhythm" (Poppyseed Remix)—4:16
"Summertime" (Organica Remix)—4:28
"I'm Gonna Lock My Heart (And Throw away the Key)" (Madison Park Remix)—4:35
"Glad to be Unhappy" (DJ Logic Remix)—4:26
"Billie's Blues" (Daniel Y. Remix)—3:11
"You're So Desirable" (Sunday People Remix)—5:31
"Pennies from Heaven" (Count de Money Remix)—3:47
"But Beautiful" (Tony Humphries THP Remix)—8:41
"All of Me" (Charles Feelgood Remix)—4:48

2007 remix albums
Billie Holiday albums
Legacy Recordings remix albums
Columbia Records remix albums
Sony Music remix albums
Jazz remix albums